Saint and Holy Martyr Theodore of Komogovo (Teodor Komogovinski; 18th century) is a Serbian Orthodox saint (holy martyr), who served as a monk in the monasteries of Komogovina and Moštanica. When the Ottomans burned Moštanica, they killed many monks, including Teodor whom they burnt alive in 1788 after he refused to renounce his Christian faith, as well as many Serbs from surrounding villages. He is remembered on Theodore's Saturday (on the first Saturday of Great Lent).

Life
Teodor Sladić (Теодор Сладић) was born in a village in Kukuruzari (modern Croatia) into a humble Serb family named Sladić. As a young man, he accompanied a monk from the Serbian Orthodox Komogovina monastery (which is near his birthplace in Kukuruzari) to Moštanica monastery near Kozarska Dubica (modern Bosnia and Herzegovina). He undertook an austere life both at Komogovina and Moštanica. When the Ottomans burned  Moštanica, they killed many monks, as well as many local Serbs from the surrounding villages.

Ascetic Theodor was ordered to give up his belief in Jesus Christ, but he refused. The Turks burned him alive in 1788 near Moštanica monastery. His body burned, but with God's miracle, his right hand has been kept and has been exempted both from the fire and degradation. This was the first sign of the holiness of this martyr.

Holy relic
The saved hand was moved to Komogovina monastery, where it was by the beginning of World War II. During the war, it was moved many times, and by the end of World War II it was found at St. Nicholas Church in Karlovac, where it remained until 1955 when it was returned to Kostajnica for safety reasons. During holidays and prayer days, the Holy hand was carried over to Komogovina so that faithful people could bow to this martyr.

Legacy and commemoration
The Holy Assembly of Bishops of the Serbian Orthodox Church on 20 May 1966 under AS number 28, record 44 took a decision: 
"Insert into the list of all Serbs holy martyrs for faith and St. Theodor (Sladić) martyr from Komogovina, therewith to be mentioned on the day of Theodor's Saturday".

He is remembered on Theodore's Saturday (Тодорова субота), which falls on the first Saturday of Great Lent.

See also
 List of Serbian Orthodox monasteries
 List of Serbian saints

References

18th-century Serbian people
18th-century Croatian people
Serbian Orthodox clergy
18th-century Eastern Orthodox martyrs
Serbian saints of the Eastern Orthodox Church
Serbs of Croatia
People from Donji Kukuruzari
Christians executed for refusing to convert to Islam
Christian saints killed by Muslims
Year of birth unknown
Habsburg Serbs
Executed Serbian people
Serbian monks